The year 551 BC was a year of the pre-Julian Roman calendar. In the Roman Empire, it was known as year 203 Ab urbe condita. The denomination 551 BC for this year has been used since the early medieval period, when the Anno Domini calendar era became the prevalent method in Europe for naming years.

Births
September 28 – Confucius, Chinese philosopher (d. 479 BC)

Deaths
Zoroaster, Persian religious prophet (approximate date)

References